Sonia Bacca is an Italian physicist known for her calculations of the interaction forces of small systems of nucleic particles. She is University Professor in Theoretical Physics at the Institute for Nuclear Physics of the University of Mainz in Germany.

Education and career
Bacca is originally from Italy, and completed a doctorate jointly between the University of Mainz and the University of Trento in Italy in 2005. After postdoctoral research at the GSI Helmholtz Centre for Heavy Ion Research she became a researcher at the TRIUMF particle accelerator in Vancouver, Canada, in 2008, also becoming an honorary lecturer at the University of British Columbia. She returned to Mainz as a professor in 2017.

Recognition
Bacca was named a Fellow of the American Physical Society (APS) in 2019, after a nomination from the APS Topical Group on Few-Body Systems & Multiparticle Dynamics, "for first-principles calculations of the electromagnetic response of nuclei, leading to insights into the microscopic origin of the giant dipole resonance, nuclear polarizability corrections in muonic atoms, and the role of three-nucleon forces in electromagnetic reactions".

References

External links

Year of birth missing (living people)
Living people
21st-century Italian physicists
Italian women physicists
21st-century German physicists
German women physicists
University of Trento alumni
Johannes Gutenberg University Mainz alumni
Academic staff of Johannes Gutenberg University Mainz
Fellows of the American Physical Society